Rinnan is an area of Levanger, Norway.

Rinnan  may also refer to:
Rinnan Station, Levander, Norway
Another spelling for Rinnal, Irish mythological king
Rinnan (surname)